The Philippines participated in the 2007 Asian Indoor Games held in Macau, China from 26 October to 3 November 2007.

Medalists

Gold

Silver

Bronze

Medal summary

By sports

References

 Official Site

Nations at the 2007 Asian Indoor Games
2007 in Philippine sport
Philippines at the Asian Indoor Games